In 1884, Somerset County Cricket Club played their third season of first-class cricket. They were captained by Stephen Newton, and played in six matches, winning only one of them.

Squad
The following players made at least one appearance for Somerset in first-class cricket in 1884. Age given is at the start of Somerset's first match of the season (8 May 1884).

Key
  denotes that the player appeared as a wicket-keeper for Somerset in 1884
 Apps denotes the number of appearances made by the player for Somerset in 1884
 Ref denotes the reference for the player details

County cricket

Season record

Match log

Batting averages

Bowling averages

Notes and references
Notes

References

Bibliography

External links

1884 in English cricket
English cricket seasons in the 19th century
Somerset County Cricket Club seasons